Eusko Alderdi Sozialista (EAS) was an underground revolutionary socialist Basque political party.

History
ETA(m) considered that armed struggle and mass struggle should be independent and clearly separated, unlike their rivals of ETA (pm) that considered that political and armed struggle were the same. In line with this idea, ETA (m) created a political party composed only of civilians that should participate and/or lead the mass struggle in Euskal Herria. The party participated in the social unrest that existed in the Basque Country during the last years of Francoism.

The party disappeared in 1975 when it merged with their Basque-French counterparts of Herriko Alderdi Sozialista, to form Euskal Herriko Alderdi Sozialista, the first Basque party at both sides of the border.

References

 Casanova, Iker and Asensio, Paul (2006). Argala. Tafalla (Navarre): Editorial Txalaparta. p. 376. .

Defunct communist parties in the Basque Country (autonomous community)
Basque nationalism
Anti-Francoism
1974 establishments in Spain
Political parties established in 1974
ETA (separatist group)
Political parties in Northern Basque Country